The National Infantry Association (NIA) was established in April 1982 at Fort Benning, Georgia as the Infantry Association, operating as a titular organization for the subscribers of “Infantry” magazine. In 1994, it was incorporated as the National Infantryman’s Association, a 501(c)(19) nonprofit organization. In 1998, the organization began doing business as the National Infantry Association.

See also
 Order of Saint Maurice (United States)

References

External links

 
501(c)(19) nonprofit organizations
1982 establishments in Georgia (U.S. state)
Infantry units and formations of the United States
Muscogee County, Georgia
Nonpartisan organizations in the United States
Non-profit organizations based in Georgia (U.S. state)
Organizations established in 1982
Professional associations based in the United States
United States Army associations